Babban Gona, which means "Great Farm" in the Hausa language, is a social enterprise organization that provides support for smallholder farmers in Nigeria to become more profitable.

Babban Gona is partly owned by the farmers it serves.

History 
Babban Gona was founded in 2012 by Kola Masha with the aim of promoting agriculture and reducing unemployment in Nigeria. Kola temporarily relocated to a small village in the Northern part of Nigeria, which had been recently impacted by insurgent activities.

At inception, Babban Gona started and provide support for 100 members in Kaduna State, Nigeria. Babban Gona currently has its operations in 15 states namely Abuja, Adamawa, Kaduna, Kano, Katsina, Bauchi, Plateau and Jigawa states. The company has  provided support for over 110,000 smallholder farmers since its inception.

In April 2017, Babban Gona became the first Social Enterprise to win Skoll Foundation Awards.

How It Works 
Babban Gona four key services to drive success for smallholder farmers:

 Training and Education
 Financial Credit
 Agricultural Input
 Harvesting & Marketing Support

Babban Gona provides support for smallholder farmers through what the company calls "Trust Groups", grassroots level farmer cooperatives. A group of 3-5 smallholder farmer members, with a trust group leader assigned to each group, who is selected after passing agronomic knowledge test and oral leadership interview. After a trust group is established, members of each trust group are trained on the following - agronomy, financial literacy, business skills and leadership through the BG Farm university platform. Babban Gona members have a loan repayment rate estimated to be at about 98%. Other trust group members are responsible for repaying if a trust group member defaults.

References 

Organizations based in Nigeria
Agricultural organizations based in Nigeria
Organizations established in 2012